The Scout and Guide movement in Niger is served by
 the Association des Scouts du Niger, member of the World Organization of the Scout Movement
 the Association nigerienne des scouts de l'environnement (non-aligned) (ANSEN), founded in 2003, which seems to have UN accreditation 
 the Mouvement des Guides et Eclaireuses du Niger, member of the World Association of Girl Guides and Girl Scouts

See also

References